Ken Freeman may refer to:

 Ken Freeman (astronomer) (born 1940), Australian astronomer and astrophysicist
 Ken Freeman (composer) (born 1947), English composer and session musician
 Kenneth John Freeman, the perpetrator of the abuse of Kylie Freeman